Vernon Brown (January 6, 1907May 18, 1979) was an American jazz trombonist.

Career 
Brown played in St. Louis

with Frankie Trumbauer in 1925–26, and moved through a variety of groups in the late 1920s and 1930s, including those of Jean Goldkette (1928), Benny Meroff, and Mezz Mezzrow (1937). Brown joined Benny Goodman's orchestra in 1937 and remained there until 1940; while he only soloed occasionally with Goodman, he became particularly well known through this association. Following this he worked with Artie Shaw (1940–41), Jan Savitt, Muggsy Spanier (1941–42), and the Casa Loma Orchestra.

In the 1940s, Brown switched focus from swing to Dixieland, playing often in studio recordings and working with Sidney Bechet.

Brown performed with Louis Armstrong and his All Stars for the ninth Cavalcade of Jazz concert held at Wrigley Field in Los Angeles. The concert was produced by Leon Hefflin, Sr. on June 7, 1953. Also featured that day were Roy Brown and his Orchestra, Don Tosti and His Mexican Jazzmen, Earl Bostic, Nat "King" Cole, and Shorty Rogers and his Orchestra.

He led his own band in the Pacific Northwest in 1950 and did reunion tours with Goodman in that decade. He worked with Tony Parenti in 1963, and remained a studio musician into the early-1970s.

Personal life 
Later in his life, Brown lived in Roslyn Heights, New York. He died in Los Angeles in 1979.

References

1907 births
1979 deaths
American jazz trombonists
Male trombonists
Jazz musicians from Illinois
20th-century American musicians
20th-century trombonists
20th-century American male musicians
American male jazz musicians